Origin recognition complex subunit 1 is a protein that in humans is encoded by the ORC1 gene. It is closely related to CDC6, and both are the same protein in archaea.

Function 

The origin recognition complex (ORC) is a highly conserved six subunits protein complex essential for the initiation of the DNA replication in eukaryotic cells. Studies in yeast demonstrated that ORC binds specifically to origins of replication and serves as a platform for the assembly of the pre-replication complex, which includes additional initiation factors such as Cdc6 and Mcm proteins. The protein encoded by this gene is the largest subunit of the origin recognition complex. While other ORC subunits are stable throughout the cell cycle, the levels of this protein vary during the cell cycle, which has been shown to be controlled by ubiquitin-mediated proteolysis after initiation of DNA replication. This protein is found to be selectively phosphorylated during mitosis. It is also reported to interact with MYST histone acetyltransferase 2 (MYST2/HBO1), a protein involved in control of transcription silencing.

Interactions 

ORC1 has been shown to interact with:

 CDC45-related protein and 
 CDC6, 
 Cell division cycle 7-related protein kinase,
 Cyclin-dependent kinase 2, 
 MCM2, 
 MCM4, 
 MCM6, 
 MCM7, 
 MYST2, 
 ORC2, 
 ORC4, 
 ORC5,  and
 SKP2.

References

Further reading

External links